Deadly Advice is a 1994 British comedy drama film directed by Mandie Fletcher and starring Jane Horrocks, Brenda Fricker and Edward Woodward.

Plot
The daughters of a domineering mother aspire to break free of her control and form romantic attachments.

Cast
 Jane Horrocks ...  Jodie Greenwood
 Brenda Fricker ...  Iris Greenwood
 Imelda Staunton ...  Beth Greenwood
 Jonathan Pryce ...  Dr. Ted Philips
 Edward Woodward ...  Maj. Herbert Armstrong
 Billie Whitelaw ...  Kate Webster
 Hywel Bennett ...  Dr. Crippen
 Jonathan Hyde ...  George Joseph Smith
 John Mills ...  Jack the Ripper
 Ian Abbey ...  Bunny
 Eleanor Bron ...  Judge
 Roger Frost ...  Rev. Horace Cotton
 Gareth Gwyn-Jones ...  Mr. Smethurst
 Richard Moore ...  Constable Dickman
 Alice Burrows ...  Joyce Cream

References

External links

1994 films
1994 comedy-drama films
British comedy-drama films
Films directed by Mandie Fletcher
1990s English-language films
1990s British films